Seven Minutes in Heaven is a 1985 American teen film co-written and by directed by Linda Feferman (in her only full-length directorial film) and starring Jennifer Connelly, Byron Thames, and Maddie Corman.

Plot

The film focuses on three teenage friends in Ohio—high school sophomores Natalie, Jeff, and Polly. Jeff is having trouble getting along with his stepfather Gerry. After an argument, he storms out of the house and goes over to his friend Natalie's house. Natalie agrees to let Jeff stay at her house for a few days while her father is away on business (her mother is deceased). 
	
Natalie and Jeff's friend Polly is upset that her crush, James Casey, is pursuing Natalie and not her. But she then meets professional baseball player and underwear model Zoo Knudsen. Polly and Zoo meet and talk and, while trying to avoid an obsessive fan, take cover in a lingerie store. Posing as an engaged couple, Zoo buys Polly a négligée. Later that night, Polly and Zoo make out in his car. Zoo asks her how old she is, and she says she is 18. Before he drives off, Zoo tells Polly to come to New York City and watch one of his games. Polly later writes Zoo a fan letter and puts the négligée under her pillow. 
	
Jeff's mother talks to his football coach and convinces him to kick Jeff off the football team as punishment for leaving home. She also runs into Jeff in person and tries to convince him to come home, but he refuses. 
	
Natalie and Casey begin to spend more time together. One evening, Polly goes over to Natalie's house. She finds Jeff sitting outside in a sleeping bag, to give Natalie and Casey some privacy. Polly then leaves, incorrectly assuming that Natalie and Casey are having sex. Later, Polly hears back from Zoo in the mail and receives a signed photo, but is disappointed when the letter turns out to be a typed, generic fan-response letter. 
	
Frustrated over Zoo, and jealous of Natalie's relationship with Casey (and believing Natalie is no longer a virgin), Polly gets into a fight with Natalie. Natalie storms out of Polly's house. Polly then tries to seduce Jeff, to lose her virginity and become sexually experienced, before she meets Zoo again. They start to get intimate, but Jeff walks out of the room when Polly talks about the Zoo. 
	
During a fire drill, Polly shouts out to Jeff, within hearing distance of Natalie, that Casey is flirting with their classmate Lisa. Casey then confesses that he never really stopped seeing Lisa. Natalie, heartbroken, tells Casey to leave her alone. She later lashes out at Jeff (who is friends with Casey), crushed that he didn't tell her that Casey and Lisa were still together the whole time. 
	
Natalie wins an academic writing competition and goes to Washington D.C. She meets the Vice President, her state senator, and Williams, a White House Aide. Williams takes Natalie sightseeing and tries to kiss Natalie, but she avoids the gesture. He then asks her to go back to his place, but Natalie declines and suggests they visit the Washington Monument. 
	
Polly goes to New York City to watch Zoo play in a baseball game. She causes a commotion when she climbs onto the dugout and pulls out the négligée to get Zoo's attention. While being detained by police, Bill, a professional photographer, intervenes and pretends to know Polly in order to keep her from getting in trouble. Bill lets Polly stay at his apartment for the night and agrees to drive her to the airport the next morning. 
	
Natalie's father arrives home and discovers that Jeff has been living with Natalie for the past several days. Natalie and Polly run into each other at the airport and reconcile. Jeff's mother is called by Natalie's father, arrives at the house, and demands that Jeff come home. Natalie comes home and is confronted by her father and Jeff's mother. Natalie apologizes to her father, but expresses her dislike of him being away from home so often. Her father apologizes too. 
	
Jeff and his mother talk on Natalie's porch. Jeff says that he is thinking about moving to California to be with his dad, but his mother reminds him that his father doesn't even have a home or a job. Jeff reminds her that Gerry is not his father, but she replies that Gerry is the only father he will ever really have. 
	
Sometime later, Jeff is outside his house playing basketball with Gerry. Natalie and Polly come by on roller skates and pull Jeff away. The three friends make their way down the street, smiling and holding hands.

Cast

In addition, Lauren Holly, in her first film role, plays Lisa.

Filming locations
Some scenes were filmed in and around Montclair High School in Montclair, New Jersey, US and Mamaroneck High School in Mamaroneck, New York.  Interior school scenes were filmed inside Nutley High School in Nutley, New Jersey.

Home media
Seven Minutes In Heaven was released on DVD on July 7, 2010.

References

External links
 

1985 films
1985 comedy-drama films
American Zoetrope films
1980s English-language films
1980s teen romance films
American coming-of-age films
American comedy-drama films
Films set in Ohio
Films set in New York City
Films set in Washington, D.C.
Films shot in New Jersey
1985 directorial debut films
1980s American films